7 South African Infantry Division was a formation of the South African Army, active from the 1960s to 1999.

History

Origin of 7 Division from existing and new Brigades
7 Division and 17, 18 and 19 Brigades were established on 1 April 1965. Difficulties with manning levels saw the disestablishment of 7 Division on 1 November 1967 and its replacement by the Army Task Force (HQ) and 16 Brigade.

Re-designated Headquarters
On 2 April 1971, a small band of officers (Brigadier Webster, Colonel Klaus Von Lieres, Colonel Hugh Hardingham, Major Barry York, Major Gerrie Moolman, Captain Bertie Suter, and Captain Manus Bothma) were summoned to meet with Major General Stapelberg (Combat General, Witwatersrand Command) to inaugurate the establishment of 7 Division, South African Army. The meeting took place at the headquarters of the Transvaal Irish Regiment in Johannesburg.

From 1 September 1972 Army Task Force Headquarters was redesignated HQ 7 Division.

Sister Divisions
Two years later, it was decided to organise the Army's conventional force into two divisions, 7th and 8th South African Armoured Divisions, under a Corps Headquarters. Both were primarily reserve (Citizen Force) formations, though the division and brigade HQs were Permanent Force. The headquarters of these two divisions were established on 1 August 1974. 1 South African Corps itself was established in August 1974 and was active until 30 January 1994.

Leadership
7 Division was commanded by:

It appears from Colonel Lionel Crook's book on 71 Brigade that two of 7 Division's three brigades were redesignations of 17th and 18th Brigades. 71 Motorised Brigade was the former 17 Brigade, 72 Brigade was the former 18 Brigade, and 73 Brigade was a new formation.

Divisional Level Attached Units

Artillery, maintenance, engineers, signals and provost (Military Police)

71 Motorised Brigade
71 Motorised Brigade was established in Cape Town (in the Western Province Command area). Units transferred from Western Province Command to the new 71 Motorised Brigade included the Cape Field Artillery, the Cape Town Highlanders, Regiment Westelike Provinsie, Regiment Boland, Regiment Oranjerivier, South African Engineer Corps 3 field squadron, 74 Signal Squadron SACS, 4 Maintenance Unit SAOSC, 30 Field Workshop SAOSC, and 3 Field Ambulance. 12 Supply and Transport Company, originally established on 22 August 1961, became 4 Maintenance Unit on 1 September 1971.

72 Motorised Brigade
72 Motorised Brigade was established in Kensington, Johannesburg 72 Motorised Brigade appears to have been made up of the following units, soon after formation in 1972. Infantry included 1st Battalion, Transvaal Scottish, the South African Irish Regiment, and the Johannesburg Regiment, artillery was provided by the Transvaal Horse Artillery, armour by the 1 Light Horse Regiment, engineer support by 12 Field Squadron SAEC, signals by 72 Signals Unit SACS, and service support by 31 Field Workshop and 7 Maintenance Unit.

73 Motorised Brigade
73 Motorised Brigade was established in Pretoria.73 Motorised Brigade may have also had its headquarters at Kensington (Johannesburg) for some time.

Mobilisation and Exercises

7 Division had its own Mobilisation Centre based at de Brug near Bloemfontein.

7 Division's major training exercises were held at Lohatla Army Battle School in the Northern Cape, called Quick Silver and Thunder Chariot, one of the most notable was the Thunder Chariot of 1984:

Command Theatres
In the early 1980s, the Army was restructured to counter all forms of insurgency while at the same time maintaining a credible conventional force. To meet these requirements, the Army was subdivided into conventional and counterinsurgency forces. The Citizen Force, through the 7th and 8th Divisions, provided the Conventional Defence Force. In 1984 Northern Transvaal Command was subdivided and Far North Command (Pietersburg) formed. These two new Commands were regarded as theatres and as such also had responsibility for conventional operations (and units) within their areas. Far North Command had 73 Motorised Brigade within its area; it is not clear how much influence HQ 7 SA Division then had over that Brigade.

Inter-divisional Reorganizing
By 1985, 7 Division consisted of 71 Motorised Brigade, 73 Motorised Brigade and 82 Mechanised Brigade. 72 Motorised Brigade had been transferred to the command of 8th South African Armoured Division.

Renaming
In the latter half of 1991 the official division designation of 7 Division was altered to 7 South African Infantry Division.

Divisional restructuring
Between 1992 until 1 April 1997, the Army reduced each division's size while creating a third divisional headquarters, 9th South African Division. Divisional headquarters remained in the Johannesburg area (7 Division). These 3 Divisions each now consisted of :
a reconnaissance battalion, 
two anti-aircraft defence battalions (AA guns), 
two battalions of artillery (G-5s and G-6s), 
a battalion of 127mm MRLs, 
an engineer battalion, 
two battalions of Olifant MBTs, 
two infantry battalions mounted in Ratel ICVs, and 
finally two infantry battalions mounted in Buffel APCs.

To provide part of these forces, 6th Light Anti-Aircraft Regiment joined 7 Division in 1991.

Divisions re-designated as Brigades and returned to 7 South African Infantry Division

74 Brigade
8th South African Armoured Division’s Brigades were disbanded in 1992 and the Battalions and Regiments came to answer directly to the Divisional headquarters. The Division itself was effectively disbanded on 1 April 1997, when its former units became part of 7 South African Division as 74 Brigade.

75 Brigade
9th South African Division, (the previous 71 Brigade) was also effectively disbanded on 1 April 1997, when its former units became part of 7 South African Infantry Division again. They were all amalgamated into the 7th South African Infantry Division on 1 April 1997, and became 75 Brigade.

Final Divisional Structure

Disbandment
7 South African Infantry Division itself was disbanded on 1 April 1999 and all army battalions were assigned to 'type' formations, in accordance with the recommendations of the South African Defence Review 1998.

Insignia

References

Additional reading
John Keegan, World Armies, p.639, cited in Lt Cdr Carl T. Orbann USN, 'South African Defense Policy,' Thesis for the Naval Postgraduate School, Monterey, CA., June 1984. Keegan edited this volume, though a different author wrote the section on the South African Army. There are at least three errors in the listing of 7 and 8 Divisions described as being as of the date of the book (1979 or 1983). Two towns are misspelt, and one regiment still has the royal title incorporated despite the 'Royal' prefix having been dropped after 1965. Thus it is not clear how accurate the South African order-of-battle section is.

Notes

1965 establishments in South Africa
1999 disestablishments in South Africa
Infantry divisions of South Africa
Disbanded military units and formations in Johannesburg
Military units and formations established in 1965
Military units and formations disestablished in 1999